The red-hipped squirrel (Dremomys pyrrhomerus) is a species of rodent in the family Sciuridae. It is found in both China and Vietnam.

References

Thorington, R.W. Jr. and R.S. Hoffman. (2005). Family Sciuridae. pp. 754–818 In Mammal Species of the World a Taxonomic and Geographic Reference. D.E. Wilson and D.M. Reeder eds. Johns Hopkins University Press, Baltimore.

Dremomys
Rodents of China
Taxonomy articles created by Polbot
Mammals described in 1895
Taxa named by Oldfield Thomas